Joseph El Khazen may refer to:
Joseph Dergham El Khazen (died 1742), Maronite Patriarch, 1733–1742
Joseph Ragi El Khazen (1791–1854), Maronite Patriarch, 1845–1854